Aaron Paye (born January 19, 1981, in Brooklyn Center, Minnesota) is an American-Liberian footballer (striker).
Paye attended Fairleigh Dickinson where he was a third team All American.  Paye was with the Minnesota Thunder of the USL from 2004 to August 8, 2008. Paye lost his spot on the team in the off-season of 2007, but was rostered back onto the team a month into the season after working hard and impressing the coaching staff. On August 8, 2008, the Minnesota Thunder announced a trade with the Atlanta Silverbacks, sending Nathan Knox back to the Minnesota Thunder, a team he had played for previously, and Paye going to the Sliverbacks in an even swap, as both are forwards.  Currently, he is the assistant coach at Blake High School, and coaches the Minneapolis United U16 Premier team.

References

External links
 Atlanta Silverbacks Player Profile

American soccer players
Liberian footballers
USL First Division players
Minnesota Thunder players
Atlanta Silverbacks players
1981 births
Living people
Fairleigh Dickinson Knights men's soccer players
Association football forwards
Sportspeople from Monrovia
People from Brooklyn Center, Minnesota